Jake and the Kid is a Canadian television drama series, which aired on the CanWest Global system of stations in the 1990s. The second television adaptation of W. O. Mitchell's 1961 short story collection Jake and the Kid, the series is set in the small town of Crocus, Saskatchewan, and centres on the friendship between Ben "the Kid" Osborne (Ben Campbell), a young boy growing up on a farm with his widowed mother Julia (Patricia Harras), and Jake Trumper (Shaun Johnston), a farmhand who becomes Ben's surrogate father figure.

The supporting cast includes Fred Keating, Brian Taylor, Lorne Cardinal, Warren Ward, Jenny Cooper, Marty Chan, Joe Norman Shaw, Henry Ramer, Tom Cavanagh, Chad Krowchuk, Gabrielle Rose, Michael Hogan, Edanna Andrews, Julie Khaner and Robert Clothier.

Mitchell's original stories were set during the Great Depression; for the series, however, the temporal setting was updated to the 1950s. The series additionally consisted largely of original scripts featuring Mitchell's characters, rather than straight dramatizations of the original stories. Although set in Saskatchewan, it was filmed in and around Leduc, Alberta.

Production and distribution
The first season premiered on December 16, 1995 and ran until March 9, 1996, and a second season was announced as part of the network's 1996–97 schedule.

Due to a loss of $500,000 in production funding when the provincial government of Alberta shut down the Alberta Motion Picture Development Corporation, the network declined to order a third season; although it committed to air the second season that had already been commissioned, by agreement with the producers it delayed the scheduling so that they could attempt to reach a deal to continue the series with another network. However, the producers also alleged that Global was dropping the series in retaliation for the Canadian Radio-television and Telecommunications Commission's concurrent denial of CanWest's applications for new stations in Calgary and Edmonton.

The second season premiered on May 24, 1997. The producers did not succeed in finding a new network deal; in October 1997, its sets and props were auctioned off. The series was aired in repeats by YTV in 1998–99, and by Global in 2000. In the US, the series aired on Showtime Family Zone in 2003.

Episodes

Season One (1995–96)

Season Two (1997)

Awards
At the 12th Gemini Awards in 1998, Harras won the Gemini Award for Best Actress in a Continuing Leading Dramatic Role, and the series was a nominee for Best Dramatic Series.

The series won four Rosie Awards from the Alberta Media Production Industries Association in 1997, for Best Television Series, Best Male Lead Performance (Johnston), Best Dramatic Script and Best Art Direction.

References

External links

1995 Canadian television series debuts
1997 Canadian television series endings
1990s Canadian drama television series
Global Television Network original programming
Television shows filmed in Alberta
Television shows set in Saskatchewan